The Detroit Express was an American soccer team based in Detroit, Michigan and a member of the American Soccer League.  They joined the league in 1981 after the original NASL Express were moved to Washington D.C. to replace the Diplomats who had folded at the end of 1980. The ASL Express played their home games in the Pontiac Silverdome and then at Tartar Field on the campus of Wayne State University.

The 1981 Express finished second in the Freedom Division with a 15 win, 11 loss and 2 tie record. Mike Mancini was the leading scorer for Detroit with 16 goals, followed by Brian Tinnion with 9. The Express advanced to the second round of the playoffs with a 4–1 defeat of the New York Eagles, but were knocked out of the semi-finals 1–1 and 1–2 by New York United.

The 1982 ASL consisted of 7 teams in one division. With 19 wins, 4 ties, and 5 losses, The Express had the best record in the league. They then won the championship, defeating the Georgia Generals in the semi-finals and the Oklahoma City Slickers in the finals. Detroit players Brian Tinnion, Andy Chapman, and Billy Boljevic were 1, 2 and 4 overall in league scoring. And goal keeper Tad DeLorm had the best goals against average in the league.

By 1983 the league had shrunk down to 6 teams, but returned to the 2 division format. The Express struggled to a 12–13 record (the league instituted a shootout rule for the season) to finish 2nd in the Western Division behind the Dallas Americans, and did not make the playoffs. Billy Boljevic and Andy Chapman led the team in scoring with 9 goals each.

The ASL and the Express folded at the end of 1983.

Yearly awards
ASL All-Star Team
1981 – Steve Westbrook
1982 – Chris Tyson

ASL Leading Goal Scorer
1982 – Brian Tinnion (22 Goals)

ASL Leading Points Scorer
1982 – Brian Tinnion (59 Points)

ASL MVP
1982 – Brian Tinnion

ASL Leading Goalkeeper
1982 – Tad DeLorm

Year-by-year

References

1981 establishments in Michigan
1983 disestablishments in Michigan
Soccer clubs in Michigan
American Soccer League (1933–1983) teams
Defunct soccer clubs in Michigan
Detroit Express
Association football clubs disestablished in 1983
Association football clubs established in 1981

it:Detroit Express